Rory is a unisex given name of Gaelic origin.

Rory may also refer to:

 Rory (band), an American band
 RORY, ICAO airport code for Yoron Airport, Yoronjima, Japan
 Rory, a blue lion who sang and played guitar in the ITV children's series Animal Kwackers

See also 
 Raury (born 1996), American musician
 Rori (disambiguation)